The Baddeck River is a minor river on Cape Breton Island, Nova Scotia, Canada. It empties into the Bras d'Or Lake several kilometres west of the village of Baddeck.

The Baddeck River flows south from the Cape Breton Highlands. It offers excellent trout fishing and bird watching. The Uisge Ban Falls are a popular feature of the river.

See also
 Baddeck, Nova Scotia
 Bras d'Or Lake
 List of rivers of Nova Scotia

References

External links
 Village of Baddeck

Rivers of Nova Scotia
Landforms of Victoria County, Nova Scotia